is a Japanese comedian, screenwriter, and novelist who won the Akutagawa Prize in 2015 for his book , which was adapted into the Netflix series Hibana: Spark.

Matayoshi is the boke of his comedy duo Peace alongside his partner Yuji Ayabe. Ayabe left Japan for New York in 2016 to continue his comedic career overseas while Matayoshi stayed in Japan, effectively making the duo inactive since then.

He is from Neyagawa City in Osaka Prefecture. He graduated from Hokuyo Senior High School (presently Kansai University Hokuyo Senior High School).

Filmography

Film
The Great Passage (2013) – Togawa
Sekai no Owari kara (2023)

Television
The Untold Story: How Tezuka created his "Black Jack" (2013) – Fujio Akatsuka
Botchan (2016) – Natsume Sōseki
Segodon (2018) – Tokugawa Iesada
Maiagare! (2022) – Iwao Yagi

Bibliography
 , Bungeishunjū, 2015, 
 , Shogakukan, 2016, 
 , Shinchosha, 2017,

References

External links 

1980 births
Living people
Japanese male comedians
Japanese television personalities
21st-century Japanese novelists
Akutagawa Prize winners
People from Neyagawa, Osaka
Kansai University alumni